D'Entrecasteaux Islands  are situated near the eastern tip of New Guinea in the Solomon Sea in Milne Bay Province of Papua New Guinea. D'Entrecasteaux Islands show signs of volcanism.

People

The inhabitants of D'Entrecasteaux Islands are indigenous subsistence horticulturalists living in small, traditional settlements. People of this area produced and traded clay pots as well as participated in the Kula exchange of shell valuables, travelling widely to other islands on sea-going sailing canoes. During the more recent past, people harvested copra, trochus and pearl-shells and some timber for cash.  Alluvial gold mining was once important and in recent years the area has been subject to mineral exploration.

Description

The three principal islands, from northwest to southeast, are Goodenough (Nidula), then across Moresby Strait to Fergusson (Moratau), the largest of the three, and across Dawson Strait to Normanby Island (Duau).

In addition there are numerous small islands and reefs. Sanaroa and Dobu are the most significant of the smaller islands, while Sori or Wild is named for [[Challenger expedition|HMS Challenger'''s]] artist, John James Wild.  The highest peak in the group is the  Mount Vineuo on Goodenough Island.

The D'Entrecasteaux Islands are volcanically active, with a number of areas of historic/geologic volcanism and active geothermal fields. There are geothermal areas in the south east area of Goodenough Island and the Bwabwadana and Iamalele on Fergusson Island. A particularly active hot springs is located at Deidei on Fergusson.

Between Fergusson and Normanby Islands the Dawson Straits Group has several volcanic centres that may define a partly submerged caldera; one of the cones on southwestern Fergusson Island may have erupted in 1350.  Geologically the islands are largely made up of rock that probably once belonged to the northern edge of the Australian plate that was thrust deep into the Earth's crust by plate collision.

The burial of these rocks to great depths (where they also encountered correspondingly high temperatures) metamorphosed the rocks to eclogite facies: >2GPa and >700˚C. Specifically, these islands play host to the youngest known coesite-eclogite sample; CA-TIMS dating of zircons within this sample dates its formation to ~5Ma, meaning it has been exhumed from a depth of ~100 km at the remarkable rate of ~20mm/yr.

The rock at the centre of the tall domes in these islands was thus recently very deep in the Earth. Over a very short time, geologically speaking, these packets of rocks have ascended through the Earth's shallow mantle and pushed through the crust to form the gneiss domes we find today – the vestiges of the crust these massifs have thrust through are still draped as carapaces over the edges of the domes.

These islands are thought to be geophysically significant because they lie immediately ahead of the west-most rift tip of the Woodlark spreading centre, which has been propagating westwards into the continent. The D'Entrecasteaux thus represent a stage of continental breakup just preceding fully-fledged volcanic spreading.

History
The group was named for the French navigator Antoine Raymond Joseph de Bruni d'Entrecasteaux, who, in his ship the Espérance'', passed through the area in 1792 while searching for his missing compatriot, Jean-François de Galaup, comte de La Pérouse.  Almost a century later, in 1874, Captain John Moresby of  made a running survey of the west coast of the islands and became the first European to make landfall.

In 1891, the Methodist Church of Australia established a mission station on Dobu Island. There, natives were recruited to work in gold mines and on copra plantations. Another mission was established in 1898 at Bwaidoga, Mud Bay, on the south coast of Goodenough Island.

The island group became a focus of activity in World War II when Imperial Japanese troops were marooned on Goodenough Island briefly in 1942, before being attacked by the Australian 2/12th Battalion.  In 1943 RAAF mobile works squadrons constructed an airfield with a  airstrip and other facilities at Vivigani Airfield on the site of a smaller, pre-war airstrip that existed at that location.

It was used by allied forces from June 1943 to August 1944 as a staging point for operations in New Guinea and nearby occupied islands. Vivigani airstrip has been open to commercial service since 1963. A US Navy PT-Boat base was established on Fergusson Island in June 1942.

References

External links

 
Archipelagoes of Papua New Guinea
Islands of Milne Bay Province
Volcanoes of Papua New Guinea